Mario Sebastián Viera Galaín (born 7 March 1983) is a Uruguayan professional footballer who plays as a goalkeeper for Colombian club Atlético Junior.

Club career
Born in Florida, Florida Department, Viera started his professional career with Club Nacional de Football. After one sole season he was expected to move to Premier League club Arsenal in August 2005, but its manager Arsène Wenger withdrew from the deal when the player did not pass his medical.

Eventually, Viera signed with Villarreal CF in Spain, moving alongside Mariano Barbosa (also a goalkeeper) on a four-year contract. He would be an undisputed starter the following two seasons, although he missed both legs of the 2005–06 UEFA Champions League semi-finals against Arsenal.

Viera eventually lost his job midway through the 2007–08 campaign to newly signed Diego López, and never regained it again – no La Liga games in 2008–09 – being released in July 2009. On 11 November he signed a one-and-a-half-year contract with Greek side Athlitiki Enosi Larissa FC, being made eligible to play however only in January 2010; his contract was terminated late into that year, and he joined Atlético Junior shortly after, remainining in Colombia for several years.

International career
Viera made his debut for Uruguay on 18 July 2004 in a Copa América quarter-final match against Paraguay, having been called as a late replacement for injured starter Fabián Carini. He also featured in the penalty shootout loss to eventual winners Brazil.

Personal life
Viera's father, also named Mario, was also a professional footballer – and a goalkeeper.

Honours
Nacional
Uruguayan Primera División: 2005

Atlético Junior
Categoría Primera A: 2011, 2018, 2019
Copa Colombia: 2015, 2017
Superliga Colombiana: 2019

See also
List of goalscoring goalkeepers

References

External links

1983 births
Living people
People from Florida Department
Uruguayan footballers
Association football goalkeepers
Uruguayan Primera División players
Club Nacional de Football players
La Liga players
Villarreal CF players
Super League Greece players
Athlitiki Enosi Larissa F.C. players
Categoría Primera A players
Atlético Junior footballers
Uruguay international footballers
2004 Copa América players
Uruguayan expatriate footballers
Expatriate footballers in Spain
Expatriate footballers in Greece
Expatriate footballers in Colombia
Uruguayan expatriate sportspeople in Spain
Uruguayan expatriate sportspeople in Greece
Uruguayan expatriate sportspeople in Colombia